Jozef Golonka (born 6 January 1938) is a Czechoslovak former ice hockey player who played in the Czechoslovak Extraliga and was a member of the Czechoslovakia national ice hockey team.  He won a bronze medal in the 1964 Winter Olympics in Innsbruck, Austria and won a silver medal in the 1968 Winter Olympics in Grenoble, France.  He was inducted into the International Ice Hockey Federation Hall of Fame in 1998. He is also a member of the Slovak Hockey Hall of Fame (2002), German Ice Hockey Hall of Fame (2004) and Czech Ice Hockey Hall of Fame (2010).

Career statistics

International

External links
 
 IIHF Hockey Hall of Fame bio

1938 births
Living people
Czechoslovak ice hockey centres
Ice hockey players at the 1960 Winter Olympics
Ice hockey players at the 1964 Winter Olympics
Ice hockey players at the 1968 Winter Olympics
Ice hockey people from Bratislava
IIHF Hall of Fame inductees
Medalists at the 1964 Winter Olympics
Medalists at the 1968 Winter Olympics
Olympic bronze medalists for Czechoslovakia
Olympic ice hockey players of Czechoslovakia
Olympic medalists in ice hockey
Olympic silver medalists for Czechoslovakia
Slovak expatriate sportspeople in Germany
Slovakia men's national ice hockey team coaches
Slovak ice hockey centres
Czechoslovak ice hockey coaches
Slovak ice hockey coaches
Czechoslovak expatriate sportspeople in West Germany
Czechoslovak expatriate sportspeople in Germany
Czechoslovak expatriate sportspeople in Switzerland
Czechoslovak expatriate sportspeople in Austria
Czechoslovak expatriate ice hockey people
Slovak expatriate ice hockey people
Expatriate ice hockey players in West Germany